Yucca gloriosa var. tristis (syn. Yucca recurvifolia, Yucca gloriosa var. recurvifolia), known as curve-leaf yucca, curved-leaved Spanish-dagger or pendulous yucca, is a variety of Yucca gloriosa. It is often grown as an ornamental plant, and is native to the southeastern United States, from coastal southeastern Virginia south through Florida and west to Texas. In contrast to Y. gloriosa var. tristis, the leaves of Y. gloriosa var. gloriosa are hard stiff, erect and narrower.

Yucca gloriosa var. tristis is often found in sandy habits like coastal sand dunes and beach scrub along with species of Opuntia. Cultivated in the warmer areas of Europe and the parts of Australia. In the United States a popular landscape plant in beach resort areas along the lower East Coast from coastal Maryland to Florida. It (or its cultivar(s)) is a recipient of the Royal Horticultural Society's Award of Garden Merit under the Yucca recurvifolia name.

Notes

Further reading

 
 
 
 Yucca plant care
 Common names of Yucca species
 Yucca I Verbreitungskarte I Fritz Hochstätter 

gloriosa var. tristis
Garden plants of North America
Flora of the Southeastern United States
Flora of Alabama